is an interchange railway station in Shinagawa, Tokyo, Japan, operated by East Japan Railway Company (JR East), Tokyo Waterfront Area Rapid Transit (TWR), and the private railway operator Tokyu Corporation.

Lines
Ōimachi Station is served by the following lines:

JR East Keihin-Tohoku Line
TWR Rinkai Line
Tokyu Oimachi Line

Station layout

JR platforms

Tokyu platforms

The Tokyu Oimachi Line platforms are scheduled to be lengthened to handle seven-car trains on express services during fiscal 2017.

TWR platforms

Chest-height platform edge doors are scheduled to be installed on the TWR platform during fiscal 2019.

Passenger statistics
In fiscal 2013, the JR East station was used by an average of 100,403 passengers daily (boarding passengers only), making it the 38th-busiest station operated by JR East. Over the same fiscal year, the TWR station was used by an average of 38,133 people daily (boarding passengers only). In fiscal 2013, the Tokyu station was used by an average of 137,025 people daily (entering and exiting passengers), making it the busiest station on the Oimachi Line. The average daily passenger figures for previous years are as shown below.

Note that the JR East and TWR statistics are for boarding passengers only.

History 
Station numbering was introduced to the Rinkai Line platforms in 2016 with Ōimachi being assigned station number R07.

Surrounding area
Yamada Denki-Shinagawa Kyurian Hall
JR Tokyo General Rolling Stock Center
The Shiki Theatre Natsu
Atré Shopping Centre
Hankyu Oimachi Garden
Shinagawa Ward Office
Shinagawa Post Office
Brillia Oi-machi La Vie En Towner
Ebara Shichi-Fuku-Jin (Seven Lucky Gods in Ebara area)
Oi zao gongen jinja shrine
Sendai miso Brewery
Zēmusu-saka
Old Sendai slope (Slope of darkness)
Ohuro no Osama

See also

 List of railway stations in Japan

References

External links

Ōimachi Station information (JR East) 
Ōimachi Station information (TWR) 
Ōimachi Station information (Tokyu) 

Railway stations in Japan opened in 1914
Keihin-Tōhoku Line
Tokyu Oimachi Line
TWR Rinkai Line
Tōkaidō Main Line
Stations of East Japan Railway Company
Stations of Tokyu Corporation
Stations of Tokyo Waterfront Area Rapid Transit
Railway stations in Tokyo